"The Right Thing to Do" is a song written and performed by Carly Simon that first appeared on her 1972 album No Secrets. The song was recorded at Trident Studios in London's Soho. It was released as the second single to the album, following "You're So Vain" and reached No. 17 on the Billboard Hot 100 and No. 4 on Billboard's Adult Contemporary chart. It also reached No. 20 on the Canada Top Singles chart and No. 9 on the Canadian Adult Contemporary chart.  It reached No. 17 in the UK.

Lyrics and music
"The Right Thing to Do" is a love song directed to Simon's then husband James Taylor.  Simon has stated that "it was actually one of my absolutely undisputed songs about James, written three months into our relationship."  Author Sheila Weller notes that the song is both romantic and realistic about the relationship.  She shows the romanticism by disregarding her lover's problems but realistic in recognizing "her fading value in the sex-and-love marketplace."  To Weller, the latter is displayed in the lines:

And it used to be for a while
The river flowed right to my door
Making me just a little too free
But now the river doesn't seem to stop here anymore

Simon acknowledged that Taylor helped "with a lot of the changes" after she had written the original lyrics and music.  Taylor claimed that he told Simon that he liked everything except the original third verse; Simon replaced the verse and Taylor approved.  Simon took the line "loving you is the right thing to do", which gave the song its title, from the movie The Last Picture Show.  Allmusic critic Joe Viglione and Billboard both praised the song's production by producer Richard Perry.  Viglione also comments on Simon's "heartfelt" vocal performance.  Simon accompanies herself on piano, and other instrumentation includes bass guitar, drums, congas, horns, and strings.  Vicki Brown and Liza Strike also provide backing vocals.  Billboard considered the "light horn backing" to be particularly effective in making the song catchy.

Reception
Weller described the melody as "fetching."  Carly Simon biographer Stephen Davis remarks on the song’s "sweet and lulling acoustics."  Viglione calls it a "great pop record" and "two minutes and fifty-seven seconds of sublime Adult Contemporary radio music", adding "There's enough tension and drama, especially in the middle eight, to lift this title above most of the introspection on the album, reaching out to all the hopeless romantics who just couldn't help but relate to it."  Viglione also suggests that Simon reused the formula of "The Right Thing to Do" a year later for her bigger hit "Haven't Got Time for the Pain."

Cash Box said that it has "fine vocals and a most interesting set of lyrics."

Personnel
Source:
 Carly Simon – lead vocals, backing vocals, piano
 Jimmy Ryan – bass guitar
 Andy Newmark – drums 
 Ray Cooper – congas
 Vicki Brown – backing vocals 
 Liza Strike – backing vocals
 Kirby Johnson – string and horn arrangement

Track listing
7" single
 "The Right Thing To Do" – 2:57
 "We Have No Secrets" – 3:57

Chart performance

Weekly singles charts

Year-end charts

Other appearances
"The Right Thing to Do" has been included on several Carly Simon compilation albums, including The Best of Carly Simon in 1975, Clouds in My Coffee in 1995, The Very Best of Carly Simon: Nobody Does It Better in 1999, Anthology in 2002, Reflections: Carly Simon's Greatest Hits and Carly Simon Collector's Edition in 2009.  It was also included on Simon's live album Greatest Hits Live.

Ray Coniff covered "The Right Thing to Do" on the 1972 album You Are the Sunshine of My Life. *Karrin Allyson remade the song for her 2004 album Wild For You. Megan Mullally sang a duet version of "The Right Thing to Do" with Simon on the TV soundtrack Will & Grace: Let the Music Out!

Simon sang "The Right Thing to Do" at the wedding of Caroline Kennedy to Edwin Schlossberg.

"We Have No Secrets"
The B-side of "The Right Thing to Do" single was "We Have No Secrets," also a song from the No Secrets album.  According to Weller, "'We Have No Secrets,' was both personally—echoing Carly's boundary-less but betrayal-laced childhood family life—and culturally resonant."  According to Simon biographers Charles and Ann Morse, it portrays Simon's efforts to remain honest with herself and others throughout her life.  The lyrics reflect on the tension between desire to know more about one's lover's past and the fact that sometimes that knowledge is painful.  The lyrics acknowledge that there are some things one may not want to know.  Weller regards the line "You always answer my questions/But they don't always answer my prayers" as "[nailing] the tension between" the supposed desirability of open, non-monogamous marriages and the reality that people want to be their lover's sole partner.  Rolling Stone critic Stephen Holden regarded "We Have No Secrets" as exemplifying the theme of No Secrets, which he saw as the "difficulty of being happy," by "painfully" expressing "the realization that emotion and rationalization are often irreconcilable."

Fox News Sunday used "We Have No Secrets" as bumper music over a clip of United States Secret Service agents when they arrived for the Ken Starr grand jury hearing.  "We Have No Secrets" has been included on multiple Carly Simon compilation albums, including The Best of Carly Simon, Clouds in My Coffee, The Very Best of Carly Simon: Nobody Does It Better, Anthology, the import version of Reflections: Carly Simon's Greatest Hits and Carly Simon Collector's Edition.

References

External links
Carly Simon's Official Website
 

Carly Simon songs
1972 songs
1973 singles
Songs written by Carly Simon
Song recordings produced by Richard Perry
Elektra Records singles